Alexandru (Alecu) Hurmuzaki (16 August 1823 in Cernauca - 8 March /20 March 1871 in Naples) was a Romanian politician and publisher.  He was one of the founding members of the Romanian Academy.

See also
Hurmuzachi family

1823 births
1871 deaths
Romanian publishers (people)
Ethnic Romanian politicians in Bukovina